(Mass in G major), FP 89, is a missa brevis by Francis Poulenc. He set most parts of the Latin mass to music in 1937, scored for a mixed choir a cappella.

History 
Poulenc turned to sacred music first in 1937 when he composed the mass Messe en sol majeur. He dedicated it to the memory of his father who had died some years before. He set all the parts of the Latin mass, with the exception of the Credo, in 1937, scored for a soprano soloist and a mixed choir a cappella. As he omitted the Credo, it is technically a missa brevis, in five movements:
 I Kyrie (Animé et très rythmé)
 II Gloria (Très animé)
 III Sanctus (Très allant et doucement joyeux)
 IV Benedictus (Calme mais sans lenteur)
 V Agnus Dei (Très pur, très clair et modéré)

The choral writing for unaccompanied choir has been described as of "cool purity". The first performance was sung in Paris on 3 April 1938 by Les Chœurs de Lyon. 

There are numerous recordings of the mass; the earliest may be a ca.1940 recording on 78 rpm of Les Chanteurs de Lyon (another name for Les Chœurs de Lyon, according to BNF) conducted by Ernest Bourmauck between 1934 and 1942 when he was succeeded by André Cluytens.

References

Bibliography

External links 
 

Compositions by Francis Poulenc
Poulenc
1937 compositions
Compositions in G major